Princess Elizabeth Juliane of Schleswig-Holstein-Sønderburg-Nordborg (24 May 1634 – 4 February 1704) was a Danish princess and a member of the House of Schleswig-Holstein-Sonderburg-Norburg by birth and a member of the House of Welf by marriage.

Life
Elizabeth Juliane was born in Nordborg as the oldest daughter of Frederick, Duke of Schleswig-Holstein-Sønderburg-Norburg, the sovereign duke of Schleswig-Holstein-Sonderburg-Norburg and his second wife Eleanor of Anhalt-Zerbst. Her paternal grandparents were John II, Duke of Schleswig-Holstein-Sonderburg and Duchess Elisabeth of Brunswick-Grubenhagen. Her maternal grandparents were Rudolph, Prince of Anhalt-Zerbst (1576–1621) and Princess Dorothea Hedwig (1587–1609).

Together with her husband, she founded a monastery for noblewomen at Schloss Salzdahlum in 1699, and then selected the monastery's first conventual women herself.

Elisabeth Juliane died at Salzdahlum on 4 February 1704 and was buried in was buried in the crypt of the Wolfenbüttel in Marienkirche, Wolfenbüttel.

Marriage and children
On 17 August 1656, Elizabeth Juliane married her cousin Anthony Ulrich, Duke of Brunswick-Wolfenbüttel. They had the following children who reached adulthood:
 Augustus Frederick (1657–1676)
 Elizabeth Eleanore Sophie (1658–1729), married John George, Duke of Mecklenburg-Mirow and Bernhard I, Duke of Saxe-Meiningen
 Anne Sophie (1659–1742), married Charles Gustav of Baden-Durlach
 Augustus William (1662–1731)
 Augusta Dorothea (1666–1751), married Anton Günther II, Count of Schwarzburg-Sondershausen-Arnstadt
 Henrietta Christine, Abbess of Gandersheim (1669–1753)
 Louis Rudolph (1671–1735)

References

1634 births
1704 deaths
People from Sønderborg Municipality
People from the Duchy of Schleswig
New House of Brunswick
17th-century Danish people
Duchesses of Brunswick-Wolfenbüttel
Duchesses of Brunswick-Lüneburg
House of Oldenburg in Schleswig-Holstein
House of Welf